Juan Domínguez Lamas (born 8 January 1990) is a Spanish professional footballer for Super League Greece club Asteras Tripolis.

Club career

Deportivo
Domínguez was born in Pontedeume, Galicia. After finishing his youth career with Deportivo de La Coruña he made his debut for the first team on 13 December 2009, replacing club great Juan Carlos Valerón for the final 35 minutes of a 1–1 away draw against UD Almería. He finished his first season with 13 La Liga appearances (eight starts, 744 minutes of action), helping them to the tenth position.

On 25 November 2011, Domínguez scored his first professional goal, netting his side's second in a 3–1 home victory over the same opponent. Roughly a month later, he renewed his contract until 2015.

Domínguez helped Deportivo to achieve promotion from Segunda División in 2012 and 2014, contributing 74 games and eight goals in the process. He scored his first goal in the top flight on 27 October 2012, in a 1–1 draw at RC Celta de Vigo.

On 28 June 2016, after featuring rarely during the season, Domínguez was loaned to RCD Mallorca of the second division.

Reus
On 23 August 2017, Domínguez signed a three-year contract with fellow second-tier team CF Reus Deportiu after cutting ties with his parent club. He scored twice in 32 matches during the campaign, as they finished in 14th place.

Halfway through 2018–19, Domínguez and the rest of the squad left after it was expelled by the Liga Nacional de Fútbol Profesional.

Abroad
On 13 February 2019, free agent Domínguez moved to the Austrian Football Bundesliga with SK Sturm Graz after agreeing to a one-and-a-half-year deal. On 29 August 2020, he joined PAS Giannina F.C. of the Super League Greece.

Career statistics

References

External links
Deportivo official profile 

1990 births
Living people
People from O Eume
Sportspeople from the Province of A Coruña
Spanish footballers
Footballers from Galicia (Spain)
Association football midfielders
La Liga players
Segunda División players
Segunda División B players
Tercera División players
Deportivo Fabril players
Deportivo de La Coruña players
RCD Mallorca players
CF Reus Deportiu players
Austrian Football Bundesliga players 
SK Sturm Graz players
Super League Greece players
PAS Giannina F.C. players
Asteras Tripolis F.C. players
Spanish expatriate footballers
Expatriate footballers in Austria
Expatriate footballers in Greece
Spanish expatriate sportspeople in Austria
Spanish expatriate sportspeople in Greece